Trypanoporida is an extinct order of encrusting animals within Class Tentaculita, which were common in Devonian oceans (Weedon, 1991). Their affinity is unknown; they have been placed among worms and corals. They appear to be closely related to other taxa of uncertain affinity, including the microconchids, cornulitids, and tentaculitids. Spirally coiled trypanoporids (Devonian) were most likely derived from the geologically older microconchids (Late Ordovician).

References

 Weedon, M.J. 1991. Microstructure and affinity of the enigmatic Devonian tubular fossil Trypanopora. Lethaia 24:227-234.

Tentaculita
Devonian animals
Late Devonian animals
Devonian first appearances
Devonian extinctions